Alec Moyse (5 August 1935 – 1994) was an English footballer who played as a forward in the Football League.

References

External links
Alex Moyse's Career

1935 births
1994 deaths
English footballers
Footballers from Mitcham
Association football forwards
Chatham Town F.C. players
Crystal Palace F.C. players
Swindon Town F.C. players
Millwall F.C. players
Poole Town F.C. players
Chelmsford City F.C. players
Romford F.C. players
Cambridge City F.C. players
Haverhill Rovers F.C. players
English Football League players